The Charles Riley House is a historic house in Newton, Massachusetts.  This large neo-Classical estate house started out as a more modest wood-frame structure built in the 1870s by Boston businessman Job Turner.  In c. 1888 Charles Riley, a manufacturer of cotton processing machinery, greatly expanded the house, giving it the present neo-Classical styling, and finishing the exterior in brick and stone.

The house was listed on the National Register of Historic Places in 1986.

See also
 National Register of Historic Places listings in Newton, Massachusetts

References

Houses on the National Register of Historic Places in Newton, Massachusetts